HD 153221 is a double star in the southern constellation of Ara. As of 2012, the pair have an angular separation of 1.10″ along a position angle of 172°.

References

External links
 HR 6300
 Image HD 153221

Ara (constellation)
153221
Double stars
G-type giants
6300
083216
Durchmusterung objects